Caronno Pertusella is a town and comune located in the province of Varese, in the Lombardy region of northern Italy. It has a population of about 17.775.

See also 
 S.C. Caronnese S.S.D.
 Caronno Pertusella railway station
 Carrozzeria Marazzi
 Gruppo Riva